Taylor Thornton is an NCAA women's lacrosse player who won the Honda Sports Award in June 2012 and was nominated for the Sports Illustrated College Athlete of the Year Award in 2013. She is an alum of Northwestern University who played for the Northwestern Wildcats.

Biography

Early life
Born Taylor Alexis Thornton in Dallas, Texas. She is the Daughter of Steve and Janice Thornton with one brother Blakely, who played football at the University of Pennsylvania.

Career
Recruited by Kelly Amonte Hiller, head coach of the Northwestern Wildcats women's lacrosse team, Thornton committed to Northwestern in October of her senior year of high school. She made her debut in 2010 starting all 22 games for the Wildcats. In her freshman year, she was named IWLCA third-team All-American, earned second team All America honors for WomensLacrosse.com and was named to the All-Rookie Team. She led the Wildcats with 29 caused turnovers and was second on the team with 38 ground balls. During her sophomore season, in 2011, Taylor established herself as a top player and premier one-on-one defender for the Wildcat team. She was named First-team IWLCA All-American and IWLCA Division I Defender of the Year. She notched 14 goals, 1 assist, 38 ground balls, and 15 caused turnovers. In 2012 she was named as a Tewaaraton award finalist. Thornton was named the winner of Lacrosse Honda Sports Award as the national player of the year. In 2013 Thornton was co-captain. She started all 85 games of her career. With 24 goals, 2 assists, 38 ground balls and 24 caused turnovers heading into playoffs.

References

American lacrosse players
Living people
Year of birth missing (living people)
Northwestern Wildcats women's lacrosse players